Sharkwater Extinction is a 2018 Canadian documentary film directed by Rob Stewart. It premiered at the 2018 Toronto International Film Festival. A sequel to his 2006 film Sharkwater, the film, which Stewart was working on at the time of his death in a diving accident in January 2017, was completed by the Rob Stewart Foundation in collaboration with director Sturla Gunnarsson and editor Nick Hector.

Release 
The film premiered on September 7, 2018, at a TIFF "Special Event" that served as both the film screening and a memorial tribute to Stewart. It also received a gala screening at the Cinéfest Sudbury International Film Festival, as well as screenings at the Calgary International Film Festival and the Vancouver International Film Festival. Rob Stewart's mother, Sandy Stewart, said "[the] entire team stayed with it, everybody stepped up. We have people from all over the world — cinematographers, filmmakers, really important people — offering to help finish this, and that was really heartwarming." Julie Andersen, who founded the nonprofit United Conservationists with Stewart, was part of this team.

Reception

Critical response 

The site's critics' consensus reads: "Beautiful yet gut-wrenching, Sharkwater Extinction offers an eye-opening condemnation of an illegal trade -- and a poignant farewell to a talented filmmaker." Metacritic reports a weighted average score of 76 out of 100 based on 8 critics, indicating "generally favorable reviews".

References

External links
 
 
 

2018 films
2018 documentary films
Canadian documentary films
Canadian sequel films
Documentary films about environmental issues
Documentary films about underwater diving
Films about sharks
Films directed by Rob Stewart
2010s English-language films
2010s Canadian films